Brahmgiani  (Punjabi: ਬ੍ਰਹਮਗਿਆਨੀ ) or The Brahm Giani in Sikhism is a highly enlightened individual being who is one with Waheguru. In Sikhism, such a person has also been named a Gurmukh, Sadhu or Sant. Other derivations of Brahmgiani have come from one possessing the knowledge of Brahman.

Usage 
Brahmgiani is explained in poetry from Guru Arjan and Guru Nanak in the Sukhmani.

See also 
 List of Hindu gurus and sants
 Sant Mat or Path of the Sants

References

Sikh terminology